Archaboilus is an extinct genus of bush-cricket that lived during the Jurassic period. Five species are known, ranging from the earliest Jurassic (Hettangian) to the end of the Middle Jurassic (Callovian) of Asia.

Although behaviors are difficult to reconstruct for extinct species, in 2012 scientists based in China, the UK, and the US recreated the call of A. musicus based on a well-preserved fossil from the Jiulongshan Formation of  China.

Based on studies, it is believed that male A. musicus produced pure-tone (musical) songs using a resonant mechanism tuned at a frequency of 6.4 kHz.

References

External links
 Recreation of an A. musicus chirp

Tettigoniidae
Middle Jurassic insects
Jurassic insects of Asia
Fossil taxa described in 2012